Secu may refer to:

Places in Romania
Secu, a commune in Dolj County
Secu, a village in Reșița, Caraș-Severin County
Secu, a village in Toplița, Harghita County
Secu, a village in Bicaz, Neamț County
 Secu, a tributary of the Bârzava in Caraș-Severin County
 Pârâul Sec, a tributary of the Neagra Broștenilor in Harghita County
 Secu, a tributary of the Popeni in Bacău County
 Secu, a tributary of the Bistrița in Neamț County
 Secu (Neamț), a tributary of the Neamț in Neamț County
 Secu, a tributary of the Botiza in Maramureș County
 Secu, a tributary of the Pogăniș in Caraș-Severin County

People
Serghei Secu, Moldovan football manager and former footballer

Other
State Employees Credit Union
Contraction of Securitate, former Romanian secret police agency
 the official acronym for the Canadian House of Commons Standing Committee on Public Safety and National Security